The Grimstone Viaduct is a railway bridge on the Castle Cary-Weymouth "Heart of Wessex" line in Dorset, England. It is directly north of the site of Grimstone and Frampton railway station, in the hamlet of Grimstone at the western edge of the parish of Stratton.

The viaduct was designed by Isambard Kingdom Brunel and was built as part of the Wilts, Somerset and Weymouth Railway line, opened by the Great Western Railway in 1857. It consists of three arches; the central arch passes over the road from Grimstone to Sydling St. Nicholas, and is connected to the arches either side of it by a series of arches within the bridge. Sydling Water flows underneath the bridge. It is a Grade II listed building.

References

Railway viaducts in Dorset
Grade II listed bridges
Grade II listed buildings in Dorset